The IJCAI Computers and Thought Award is presented every two years by the International Joint Conference on Artificial Intelligence (IJCAI), recognizing outstanding young scientists in artificial intelligence. It was originally funded with royalties received from the book Computers and Thought (edited by Edward Feigenbaum and Julian Feldman), and is currently funded by IJCAI.

It is considered to be "the premier award for artificial intelligence researchers under the age of 35".

Laureates
Terry Winograd (1971)
Patrick Winston (1973)
Chuck Rieger (1975)
Douglas Lenat (1977)
David Marr (1979)
Gerald Sussman (1981)
Tom Mitchell (1983)
Hector Levesque (1985)
Johan de Kleer (1987)
Henry Kautz (1989)
Rodney Brooks (1991)
Martha E. Pollack (1991)
Hiroaki Kitano (1993)
Sarit Kraus (1995)
Stuart Russell (1995)
Leslie Kaelbling (1997)
Nicholas Jennings (1999)
Daphne Koller (2001)
Tuomas Sandholm (2003)
Peter Stone (2007)
Carlos Guestrin (2009)
Andrew Ng (2009)
Vincent Conitzer (2011)
Malte Helmert (2011)
Kristen Grauman (2013)
Ariel D. Procaccia (2015)
Percy Liang (2016) for his contributions to both the approach of semantic parsing for natural language understanding and better methods for learning latent-variable models, sometimes with weak supervision, in machine learning.
Devi Parikh (2017)
Stefano Ermon (2018)
Guy Van den Broeck (2019) for his contributions to statistical and relational artificial intelligence, and the study of tractability in learning and reasoning.
Piotr Skowron (2020) for his contributions to computational social choice, and to the theory of committee elections.
Fei Fang (2021) for her contributions to integrating machine learning with game theory and the use of these novel techniques to tackle societal challenges such as more effective deployment of security resources, enhancing environmental sustainability, and reducing food insecurity.
Bo Li (2022) for her contributions to uncovering the underlying connections among robustness, privacy, and generalization in AI, showing how different models are vulnerable to malicious attacks, and how to eliminate these vulnerabilities using mathematical tools that provide robustness guarantees for learning models and privacy protection.

See also 

 List of computer science awards

References

Academic awards
Artificial intelligence
Computer science awards